Fiobbio is a village in the province of Bergamo in Italy. It is a frazione of the comune of Albino.

Geography
The village is in northern Italy, in the region of Lombardy.

History
The organ in the Church of Santo Antonio di Padova in Fiobio dates to 1914.

Famous residents
Fiobio is the birthplace of Blessed Pierina Morosini.

References
 Commune of Fiobbio web site http://www.guidacomuni.it/Schedaloc.asp?ID=11462
 Historical Church Organ http://www.provincia.bergamo.it/OrganiStorici/out/eng/or241000104.htm

Cities and towns in Lombardy
Frazioni of the Province of Bergamo